Epiphanius ("clearly manifested") may refer to:

 Epiphanius of Petra (fl. c. 335), Arab sophist at Athens
 Saint Epiphanius of Salamis (c.310–20 to 403), bishop of Salamis, Cyprus, and author of the Panarion
 Annius Eucharius Epiphanius, praefectus urbi of the city of Rome, 412–414
 Saint Epiphanius of Pavia (438–496), Bishop of Pavia, Italy, 466–496
 Epiphanius Scholasticus (fl. c.510), translator of Greek works into Latin
 Epiphanius of Constantinople (died 535), Greek Ecumenical Patriarch of Constantinople, 520–535
 Epiphanius (Patriarch of Aquileia), first Patriarch of Aquileia to rule from Grado, Italy, 612–613
 Epiphanius the Monk (8th or 9th century), priest in the Kallistratos monastery, Constantinople
 Epiphanius the Wise (died 1420), Russian monk, hagiographer, and disciple of Saint Sergius of Radonezh
 Epiphanius Evesham (fl. 1570–c. 1623), English sculptor
 Epiphanius Slavinetsky (died 1675), ecclesiastical expert of the Russian Orthodox Church
 Epiphanius Shanov (1849–1940), Bulgarian Uniate priest
 Epiphanios of Vryoula (1935–2011), Eastern Orthodox archbishop of Spain and Portugal
 Anba Epiphanius (1954–2018), murdered Egyptian abbot of Monastery of Saint Macarius the Great
 Epiphanios of Mylopotamos (1956–2020), Greek Orthodox monk and chef at Mount Athos
 Epiphanius I of Ukraine (born 1979), elected primate of the Orthodox Church of Ukraine (since 15 December 2018) and Metropolitan of Kyiv and All Ukraine

Places
Monastery of Saint Epiphanius, founded by Epiphanius Scholasticus

See also
Epiphanes (disambiguation)